28 Lower Fort Street, Millers Point is a heritage-listed former residence and now boarding house at 28 Lower Fort Street, in the inner city Sydney suburb of Millers Point in the City of Sydney local government area of New South Wales, Australia. The property was added to the New South Wales State Heritage Register on 2 April 1999.

History 
Millers Point is one of the earliest areas of European settlement in Australia, and a focus for maritime activities. Early Victorian town house now part of a terrace streetscape. First tenanted by the NSW Department of Housing in 1985.

Description 
Two storey Victorian townhouse with cast iron balustrade at ground floor and iron balcony lace. Two french doors open onto second floor balcony. This building is now a seven-room boarding house, including a substantial rear addition and new adjoining building. Storeys: Two; Construction: Painted rendered masonry, corrugated galvanised iron roof, cast iron balustrade at ground floor and iron balcony lace. Style: Victorian Regency.

The external condition of the property is good.

Heritage listing 
As at 23 November 2000, this two storey stuccoed Victorian townhouse was built .

It is part of the Millers Point Conservation Area, an intact residential and maritime precinct. It contains residential buildings and civic spaces dating from the 1830s and is an important example of 19th century adaptation of the landscape.

28 Lower Fort Street, Millers Point was listed on the New South Wales State Heritage Register on 2 April 1999.

See also 

Australian residential architectural styles
24-26 Lower Fort Street
30-42 Lower Fort Street

References

Bibliography

Attribution

External links

 
 

New South Wales State Heritage Register sites located in Millers Point
Victorian Regency architecture in Australia
Houses in Millers Point, New South Wales
Articles incorporating text from the New South Wales State Heritage Register
Houses completed in 1860
1860 establishments in Australia
Millers Point Conservation Area